Royal Club is a Chinese professional League of Legends team that competes in the League of Legends Development League (LDL), the second highest level of competitive League of Legends in China. The team was founded in 2012 and was known as Star Horn Royal Club from 2014 to 2016 to reflect its titular sponsor, Star Horn. They were the first team to reach the finals of the League of Legends World Championship twice, doing so in 2013 and 2014. The only member of both squads was Jian "Uzi" Zi-Hao. Royal Club is currently the academy team of Royal Never Give Up.

History

2013 
Royal Club started off the year with their participation in the G-League 2012 Season 2, finished at 3-4th place after losing against Team WE 1–4. They then attended GIGABYTE StarsWar League/Season 2 in March but got knocked out in the Group Stage. In June, Royal Club finished fifth in 2013 LPL Spring, went 15–13 in the Group Stage and did not qualify for playoffs. One day after, they participated in the NVIDIA Game Festival 2013 and placed second after losing against Team WE in the finals. In July, Royal HZ took part in StarsWar 8 tournament. They got knocked out in the semifinals, lost 0–2 to iG. At the end of July, they once again lost 0–2 to iG in the semifinals of IEM Season VIII - Shanghai and finished 3-4th. In September, Royal HZ qualified for the Season 3 China Regional Finals after finishing second in the 2013 LPL Summer/Regular Season with a 13–8 record over the season. In the Season 3 China Regional Finals, Royal HZ made an amazing comeback, went from the Loser's bracket to defeat OMG in the Grand Finals, claimed the first place and not only a spot in the Season 3 World Championship but the huge advantage of being seeded directly into the quarterfinals past the group stages.

At the S3 Championship, Royal Club would be a dark horse team in the quarterfinals as they were not as well known outside the Asian scene, and Worlds was their first major tournament in North America. Their first match would be against a team they were exceptionally familiar with from the Chinese league, OMG. In the first match of bracket stage, the two Chinese teams would re-enact the Chinese Regional Finals to see who would advance and who would be eliminated from the tournament. OMG had been seen as one of the strongest teams in the Group stage, losing only once to the eventual champions SK Telecom T1, but Royal Club were well prepared going into the match. They defeated their Chinese compatriots in a 2–0 victory, advancing to face Europe's top seed, Fnatic. The series would lead to a back and forth heavy hitting battle between the regions, with Royal able to win the final game, 3–1. Royal Club found themselves in the ultimate spotlight in the grand finals against favored Korean team SK Telecom T1. The anticipated match led to Royal Club being overwhelmed by SK T1, losing 0–3, but taking home a very respectable second place.

After the S3 Championship, Tabe and Wh1t3zZ retired while Lucky became a sub. Uzi then became team captain and briefly tried out other positions such as jungle and mid. In order to prepare for the 2014 LPL Spring, Royal Club significantly changed most of their roster, with many new faces joining the team, including the former LMQ Tian Ci top laner Yao and support Bao.

2014 
On May 17, 2014, the previous Owner of Royal Club announced he was stepping down as CEO of the team and giving ownership over to Li Yande (eNO), where the team would be re-branded as Star Horn and take Royal Club's place for the LPL Summer Season.

The roster at the time consisted of Yao, Kmi, Lucky, Nct, Uzi, Bao, LeY, Rui, YS. May 28, LaoPi, corn, and Cola join. May 31, inSec and Zero join. December 6, ackerman joins. December 11, Uzi leaves.

Royal Club beat LPL team OMG 3–2 in the semi-finals. Royal Club reached the finals of the 2014 League of Legends World Championship and lost to Samsung Galaxy White 3–1.

2015 
Star Horn finished tenth in the 2015 LPL Spring Round Robin, eliminating them from the playoffs.

Roster

References 

2012 establishments in China
Esports teams based in China
Esports teams established in 2012
Former League of Legends Pro League teams